George Holme Sumner (10 November 1760 - 26 June 1838) was at various stages throughout the 18th and 19th century one of the two Members of Parliament for Ilchester, Guildford, and Surrey.

Born in Calcutta, Sumner was educated at Harrow School and Emmanuel College, Cambridge. He served as an officer of the Surrey Militia.

References

1760 births
1838 deaths
People educated at Harrow School
Alumni of Emmanuel College, Cambridge
Members of the Parliament of Great Britain for English constituencies
Members of the Parliament of the United Kingdom for English constituencies
British MPs 1784–1790
British MPs 1790–1796
UK MPs 1806–1807
UK MPs 1807–1812
UK MPs 1812–1818
UK MPs 1818–1820
UK MPs 1820–1826
UK MPs 1830–1831
Surrey Militia officers